The Rabbit Card is a rechargeable contactless stored value smart card used to transfer electronic payments in systems in Thailand. It was launched in May 2012 to collect fares for the BTS Skytrain and the Bangkok BRT. The card can be recharged at minimum THB100 at a time. It can be recharged at all BTS and BRT ticket offices and most of McDonald's branches in Thailand.

The Card can be used for payment at partner convenience stores, supermarkets, restaurants, cinemas, and other point-of-sale applications such as service stations and vending machines.

See also 
 Electronic money
 List of smart cards

References

External links 
 Official home page

Contactless smart cards
Public transport in Thailand
Economy of Thailand